Draksharamam is a village in Konaseema district of the Indian state of Andhra Pradesh. The Bhimeswara Swamy Temple in this town is one of the five temples of Shiva known as Pancharama Kshetras.

Ashta Someswaras
Eight lingas are consecrated in eight directions (cardinal and intercardinal) of Draksharama. These  temples are known as Ashta Someswaras.

Etymology 
This village was formerly known as Dhakshatapovana and Dhakshavatika.

See also 
Andhra Vishnu
Pancharama Kshetras

References

External links 

Hindu pilgrimage sites in India
Pancharama Kshetras
Archaeological sites in Andhra Pradesh